Mount Scabby is a mountain with an elevation of   that is located in the Scabby Range and is situated on the border of the Australian Capital Territory and New South Wales, Australia. The summit of the mountain is located within the ACT.

The ACT portion of the mountain is located within Namadgi National Park and the NSW side within the Scabby Nature Reserve.

See also

 Australian Alps
 List of mountains in New South Wales

References

Kelly
Kelly
Borders of New South Wales
Borders of the Australian Capital Territory